Dominique Jayne Allen (born 10 September 1989) is a British basketball player, currently playing for the Manchester Mystics of the Women's British Basketball League (WBBL). She was a member of the British women's basketball team at the 2012 Summer Olympics.

Career

College career

Allen started her career in Birmingham, before spending two seasons playing in the English Basketball League and BUSA competition for Northumbria University, where she earned Most Valuable Player honors in 2006-07. She then transferred to Oral Roberts University in Tulsa, Oklahoma (playing alongside British teammate Georgia Jones), playing 10 games in her first season and 33 in her sophomore year.

In 2010-11, she averaged 5.7 points and 6.0 rebounds per game in 34 games played, including a career-best 15-point and 10 rebound effort against Western Illinois University, her first career double-double.

In her senior season, she averaged 4.3 points and 4.1 rebounds, starting 12 of 31 games played. played her final college game against Wichita State University on March 16, 2012 in the first round of the 2012 Women's National Invitation tournament, playing eight minutes in a 79-57 loss.

International career
Having already represented Great Britain at the 2008 and 2009 European Championships as an under-20 (averaging 5.2 points and 7.3 rebounds in 2009), Allen went on to play for the GB Futures team at the 2011 World University Games in Shenzhen, China. Allen made her senior international debut in 2012 against Croatia, before being selected as one of twelve players to represent Great Britain at the 2012 Summer Olympics in London. It marked her first appearance in the senior international squad, and the first Oral Roberts University Alumni to appear at an Olympics. It also marked the first appearance of a women's basketball team from Great Britain at an Olympic Games. Allen played for the Great Britain senior team during the 2013, 2015, and 2017 EuroBasket tournaments.

Allen was a member of the Great Britain women's team that competed at the 2018 Commonwealth Games, earning the silver medal after losing 99-55 to Australia in the gold-medal match.

Professional career 
Allen made her professional debut in the 2012-13 season with Italian side Bologna, becoming a regular starter. She left Bologna to sign with the Manchester Mystics for the 2017-18 season, being named the Molten WBBL Player of the Month in January 2017, and later that season, led the Manchester Mystics to a WBBL Cup Final win, earning MVP awards after a 21-point, 11-rebound performance in the final.

In November 2018, she signed a contract with ACS Sepsi in Romania. She also played for Visby Ladies in Sweden in 2019, before returning to the Washington Mystics for the 2019-20 WBBL season.

Career statistics

Oral Roberts University

Personal life
Dominique is the daughter of former Birmingham Bullets and England men's international Clive Allen. While at Oral Roberts University, Dominique played under the same coach as her father when he was at Northwest Nazarene University. In 2012, she graduated from Oral Roberts with a degree in graphic design.

References
General

Specific

External links

Living people
1989 births
People from Wordsley
British women's basketball players
Oral Roberts Golden Eagles women's basketball players
Alumni of Northumbria University
Basketball players at the 2012 Summer Olympics
Olympic basketball players of Great Britain
Black British sportswomen
English people of Ghanaian descent
Commonwealth Games medallists in basketball
Commonwealth Games silver medallists for England
Basketball players at the 2018 Commonwealth Games
Medallists at the 2018 Commonwealth Games
Sportspeople from the West Midlands (county)
British expatriate basketball people in the United States
English expatriate sportspeople in the United States
Expatriate basketball people in Sweden
English expatriate sportspeople in Sweden
British expatriate basketball people in Italy
English expatriate sportspeople in Italy
British expatriate basketball people in France
English expatriate sportspeople in France
British expatriate basketball people in Germany
English expatriate sportspeople in Germany
Expatriate basketball people in the Czech Republic
English expatriate sportspeople in the Czech Republic
British expatriate basketball people in Austria
English expatriate sportspeople in Austria